
Gmina Lanckorona is a rural gmina (administrative district) in Wadowice County, Lesser Poland Voivodeship, in southern Poland.

Villages
Gmina Lanckorona contains the villages and settlements of Izdebnik, Jastrzębia, Lanckorona, Podchybie and Skawinki.

Neighbouring gminas
Gmina Lanckorona is bordered by the gminas of Budzów, Kalwaria Zebrzydowska, Skawina, Stryszów and Sułkowice.

References
Polish official population figures 2006

Lanckorona
Wadowice County